The Woman in the Hall is a 1947 British drama film directed by Jack Lee and starring Ursula Jeans, Jean Simmons, Cecil Parker. The screenplay was written by Jack Lee, Ian Dalrymple and Gladys Bronwyn Stern, from Stern's 1939 novel of the same title.

It was made by Wessex Film Productions at Pinewood Studios, with sets designed by Peter Proud.

It was the film debut of actress Susan Hampshire, as a young child.

Plot
Lorna Blake (Ursula Jeans) is a widow with two daughters.  She augments her slender income by using her children to extort money, visiting the houses of the rich to tell a pathetic story and beg for help.

Lorna makes a rich capture when Sir Halmar Bernard (Cecil Parker) proposes marriage to her. She tells him that she has only one daughter, Molly (Jill Raymond). When her other daughter, Jay (Jean Simmons), is arrested for forging a cheque, Lorna refuses to help her.

Cast

Ursula Jeans as Lorna Blake
Jean Simmons as Jay
Cecil Parker as Sir Halmar
Edward Underdown as Neil Ingelfield
 Joan Miller as Susan
 Jill Freud as Molly Blake 
 Nigel Buchanan as Toby
 Ruth Dunning as Shirley Dennison
 Russell Waters as 	Alfred
 Terry Randall as 	Ann
Lily Khan as Baroness Von Soll
 Barbara Shaw as Mrs. Maddox
 Martin Walker as Judge
 Totti Truman Taylor as Miss Gardiner
 Hugh Pryse as Counsel for the Defense
 Everley Gregg as Lady Cloy
 Alexis France as Miss Mounce
 Hugh Miller as Mr. Walker
Susan Hampshire as Young Jay
 Campbell Singer as Von Soll's servant
 Grace Denbeigh-Russell as Mrs. Phillimore 
 June Elvin as Daffy
 Joan Sterndale-Bennett as Shop assistant

Production
Jack Lee later recalled the experience of working for Wessex "revolted me" because "it reminded me of when I was a child and my mother would send me out on begging expeditions because she never had any money. It was a bloody awful novel and a terrible film."

References

External links

1947 films
British black-and-white films
Films based on British novels
Films directed by Jack Lee
Films shot at Pinewood Studios
British drama films
1947 drama films
Films produced by Ian Dalrymple
Films with screenplays by Ian Dalrymple
Films set in England
1940s British films